Just MeI-dle, also known as 2022 (G)I-DLE WORLD TOUR JUST MEI-DLE is the first concert tour headlined by South Korean girl group (G)I-dle. The name was derived from the lyric featured in the song "Tomboy" of their first studio album, I Never Die (2022). The world tour commenced with three shows in Seoul on June 17, 2022, and continued onto several cities in Asia, North America, and Latin America, comprising 21 shows in 18 countries. This is the group's first in-person concert tour since their debut in 2018. The tour ended on October 1, 2022, in Singapore.

Background
On May 12, 2022, Cube shared an official announcement through a poster on social media that the group's 3rd tour will be called 2022 (G)I-dle World Tour "Just MeI-dle" with the first leg kicking off in Seoul. Cube added additional concerts in Seoul not long after due to overwhelming demand. It was reported that all three dates in Seoul including the additional date were sold out in three minutes. Due to huge demand, the group's New York City and Mexico City show has been moved to a larger venue from Webster Hall to Terminal 5 and Auditorio BB to Pepsi Center WTC, respectively. The concert in Japan on September 16 and 17, was a 2-day virtual pay-per-view concert through distribution platform, Uliza.

Concert synopsis
The five-themed performance overwhelms the stage with different performances and atmospheres – '[HEROiNE: Cliché] JUST ME (G)I-DLE' filled with the group's trademark visual color, 'a tragic HEROiNE' which was tied traditional Korean folk elements, 'I NEVER DIE' which kicked off the incorporation of a live band, the pop-punk reminiscent 'THiS iS My ATTiTUDE,' and lastly, the encore stage 'iT NEVER ENDS: NEVERLAND'. The show begins with (G)I-dle appearing on the stage in all-black outfits under a red light with swirling smoke effects, haunting Gregorian chant filling the dark venue and the sound of the bell opening into "Oh My God", then continued with "Villain Dies" and debut single "Latata" while the fans coloured the venue with light sticks. The first theme finished with "Blow Your Mind," "Senorita", and summer songs "Dumdi Dumdi" and "Luv U", which they performed with a tropical backdrop and gold streamers falling over the stage and crowd.

In the second theme of 'a tragic HEROiNE', (G)I-dle appeared in floral dresses that incorporated traditional Korean folk motifs, embroidered with white and red flowers. The stage design centering around dream-like concept with a large moon, which subsequently served as the backdrop to the performance of "Hann (Alone in Winter)", "Hann (Alone)", "Moon", "Already", "Hwaa" accompanied by dancers reflecting the refined mood of these songs' concepts. As they danced, the moon would shift into different colours and shapes, with the members' shadows projected behind them. 

The third theme was 'I Never DiE', (G)I-dle performed their 2019 Queendom single "Lion" and "Liar," where they joined by their back-up dancers and a live band, who remained to perform behind them throughout the rest of the concert. The stage was designed to match the original 'regality' of the "Lion" finale performance, with the members performing in front of a royal red backdrop with large golden frames outlining the jumbotron stage video. In addition, from the stage of "Lion", all the members used hand microphones. For the "Liar" stage, the group performed using a standing microphone.

The group proceeded with "Never Stop Me" to start the fourth segment 'I NEVER DIE', during which they performed while running around the stage and interacting with the live band in a way that mimicked a lively rock concert, and subsequently performed "Uh-Oh". After the song ended, Yuqi boasted, "I like band music, I did it with wonderful people while preparing for the concert." Next, (G)I-dle sang "My Bag", which has a catchy hip-hop melody and performs a strong hip-shaking (twerking) choreography. The members battled for the place of 'Twerking Queen, ' making the audience laugh as they set out to determine which one could do the twerk-like "My Bag" point choreography the best. They then sings a cover of K/DA's "Pop/Stars" and performs an explicit version of "Tomboy". The concert ended with "I'm the Trend", "Polaroid", and "Escape", during which the songs were performed as an encore under the theme 'ENCORE iT NEVER ENDS: NEVERLAND'.

Critical reception
Lee Seung-rok of My Daily praised the team's professionalism in the fifth year of debut and their comfortable performance on stage, being this their first offline concert. He wrote: "(G)I-dle's abilities reached their peak when they performed "Hwaa" that was released last year after going through the songs of the same name, "Hann (Alone)", "Hann (Alone in Winter)". This is because, with leader Soyeon, Miyeon, Minnie, Yuqi, and Shuhua in the lead, the members' mixed songs, gestures, eyes and expressions felt as if they were looking at a work of art. Last year, the remaining members filled the vacancy left by a member, and the synergy of the whole (G)I-dle has matured." Kim Hee-seo from Celev acknowledged "(G)I-dle's colourful set list that contains their unique personality was pleasing to the eyes and ears - from rock music to bands and hip-hop" and added that she enjoyed the stage regardless of whether it was their first offline concert and world tour. Kim Soo-jung from No Cut News commenced that the performance shown by (G)I-dle shows "why [they] are recognized as 'stage-type' and 'performance-type' singers." Reviewing the same show, Lee Mi-young of Joynews24 wrote: For over two hours, they showed unshakable singing ability on stage and added perfection to the stage with their splendid performance. Through various stages ranging from 21 songs, they exuded various charms, exuding their unique charisma, sexy, and girl crush, as well as cute and lovely. Costumes such as black hot pants, crop tops, and dresses with flower decorations delighted the eyes of the fans, and the live band lit up on the stage to show off the sound. 

After San Francisco's show, in a review from This Is Hype!, Duey Guison commended the (G)I-dle's vocals stating they were "singing live–and it's very evident especially with Minnie, Yuqi, Miyeon, and Shuhua singing their respective lines and Soyeon simply standing out with her killer rap lines" while also praised their's "impressive" stage interaction with the audience as they were "very lively" without the need for translators and praised the costume production "that were fit for every arc of the concert". He concluded in his review that they "set a good barometer on what to expect in a live KPop concert". Evi from The Seoul Story, who reviewed the Kasablanka concert in Jakarta, wrote that the group "proved they are multi-talented in presenting diverse sides of themselves on stage while blending them all into one cohesive storyline", and concluded that "(G)I-DLE successfully pulled off a memorable night ... with their authentic selves and amazing performances".

A reviewer from Selective Hearing was mixed in his review during the Seattle concert, saying it "(G)I-dle was still fantastic from far away" and "It was not the fault of (G)I-dle". He was critical towards the external things outside the stage – dead crowd, cramped space, heat exhaustion, dehydration, cell phone cameras blocking the view, fast-paced hi-touch event feeling like "slapping random gloved hands attached to pretty women".

Set list
This set list is from the concert on June 17, 2022, in Seoul. It is not intended to represent all shows from the tour.

 "Oh My God"
 "Villain Dies"
 "Latata"
 "Blow Your Mind"
 "Senorita"
 "Dumdi Dumdi"
 "Luv U"
 "Hann (Alone in Winter)"
 "Hann (Alone)"
 "Moon"
 "Already"
 "Hwaa"
 "Lion"
 "Liar"
 "Never Stop Me"
 "Uh-Oh"
 "My Bag"
 "Pop/Stars" 
 "Tomboy" (explicit)

Encore
 "I'm the Trend"
 "Polaroid"
 "Escape"
 "Latata (English Version)"

Tour dates

Personnel

 Artists
 (G)I-dle
 Miyeon
 Minnie
 Soyeon
 Yuqi
 Shuhua

 Band
 Shin Ye-chan (Keyboard)
 Lee Sang-min (Drums)
 Choi In-sung (Bass)
 Dongmin (Guitar)

 Dancers
 Star System
 Bang Min-ju
 Kim Ji-young
 Lee Dong-ha
 Han Ji-won
 Kim Min-ju
 So Hyun
 Lee Kyung-jin
 Kim Da-in

 Tour organizers
 Cube Entertainment
 CJ ENM

Tour promoter
 ACO Media & Hitman Solutions (MY)
 Be Here Now KPOP (TH)
 Ninshi Entertainment (Latin America)
 OneProduction (SG)
 Pia Corporation (JP)
 Powerhouse Live (North America)

 Ticketing partners
 Interpark (KR)
 Live Nation (SG)
 Mecimapro (ID)
 SuperBoletos (Monterrey)
 Thaiticketmajor (TH)
 Ticketmaster (North America, Latin America)
 Ticket2U (MY)

Gallery

Notes

References

(G)I-dle
(G)I-dle concert tours
2022 concert tours
K-pop concerts
Concert tours of Asia
Concert tours of Indonesia
Concert tours of Japan
Concert tours of Malaysia
Concert tours of Mexico
Concert tours of North America
Concert tours of Singapore
Concert tours of South Korea
Concert tours of Thailand
Concert tours of the Philippines
Concert tours of the United States
June 2022 events in South Korea